A lottery is a form of gambling which involves the drawing of lots for a prize.

Lottery may also refer to:

Arts and entertainment

Publications
 "The Lottery", a 1948 short story by Shirley Jackson
 Lottery (novel), a novel by Patricia Wood
 Lottery (short story), a 1933 short story by Munshi Premchand

Films and television
 The Lottery, a 1969 film based on the short story "The Lottery"
 The Lottery, a 1996 TV film based on the short story "The Lottery"
 The Lottery (1989 film), an American comedy short film 
 Lottery (2009 film), a Bollywood romance thriller film
 The Lottery (2010 film), an American documentary film
 Lottery (2018 film), an Iranian romance film
 The Lottery (TV series), a 2014 drama television series
 Lottery! (1983–1984), an American television show

Music
 Lottery (Kali Uchis song), 2015
 Lottery (K Camp song), 2019
 "Lottery", a 2007 song by Chris Brown from Exclusive

Sports
 Lottery (horse), a 19th-century champion racehorse
 NBA draft lottery, a lottery used to determine the draft order in the National Basketball Association
 NHL draft lottery, a lottery used to determine the draft order in the National Hockey League

Other uses
 Lottery (probability), a concept used in expected utility theory
 Lottery voting, an electorate system
 Mountain Road Lottery, a lottery sponsored by George Washington in 1768
 Postcode lottery, a phrase used in the United Kingdom to describe the differences in services depending on geographic location
 Cleromancy, divination by lot

See also 
 National lottery (disambiguation)
 Lotería, a Mexican game resembling bingo
 Silesian Lottery, a gambling card game